Lilioceris cheni, the air potato leaf beetle, is a species of beetle in the genus Lilioceris that feeds on air potato plants. Air potatoes and the beetles are both native to Asia but have been introduced elsewhere. The air potato plants are an invasive species found throughout Florida, and the beetles were introduced in 2012 by biologists in Florida to help control the spread of the air potato.

References

Further reading
Air Potato Leaf Beetle (Suggested Common Name), Lilioceris cheni Gressitt and Kimoto (Insecta: Coleoptera: Chrysomelidae: Criocerinae) Ted D. Center and William A. Overholt2 University of Florida IFAS Extension
common name: air potato leaf beetle (suggested common name) scientific name: Lilioceris cheni Gressitt and Kimoto (Insecta: Coleoptera: Chrysomelidae: Criocerinae) Featured Creatures, University of Florida IFAS

Criocerinae
Beetles described in 1961